Fritillaria taipaiensis is a flowering plant species in the lily family Liliaceae. It is found only in China, in the Provinces of Gansu, Hubei, Shaanxi and Sichuan.

This herbaceous perennial produces bulbs up to 20 mm in diameter. The stem is up to 100 cm tall. The flowers are nodding and pendent, yellow-green with deep purple markings.

formerly included
Fritillaria taipaiensis var. ningxiaensis Y.K.Yang & J.K.Wu - now called Fritillaria yuzhongensis G.D.Yu & Y.S.Zhou
Fritillaria taipaiensis var. yuxiensis Y.K.Yang, Z.Y.Gao & C.S.Zhou - now called Fritillaria yuzhongensis G.D.Yu & Y.S.Zhou
Fritillaria taipaiensis var. zhouquensis S.C.Chen & G.D.Yu - now called Fritillaria sichuanica S.C.Chen

References

External links
Flora of China Illustrations vol. 24, fig. 111, 4-5  drawings of 3 species including Fritillaria taipaiensis
Nature Library, 太白贝母  （Fritillaria taipaiensis）  color photo
Plant Photo,  太白贝母 Fritillaria taipaiensis P. Y. Li  中国植物志   two color photos, captions in Chinese

taipanensis
Endemic flora of China
Plants described in 1966